Vicente Silva Manansala (January 22, 1910 – August 22, 1981) was a Filipino cubist painter and illustrator. One of the first Abstractionists on the Philippine art scene Vicente Manansala is also credited with bridging the gap between the city and the suburbs, between the rural and cosmopolitan ways of life. His paintings depict a nation in transition, an allusion to the new culture brought by the Americans. Manansala together with Fabian de la Rosa are among the best-selling Philippine artists in the West.

He was a member of the prominent Cruz, Manansala, Lopez family clan. He is considered one of the 13 Moderns, a group of modernists associated with Victorio Edades.

Early life

Manansala was born on January 22, 1910 in San Roque, Macabebe, Pampanga.  From 1926 to 1930, he studied at the U.P. School of Fine Arts.  In 1949, Manansala received a six-month grant by UNESCO to study at the École des Beaux-Arts in Banff and Montreal, Quebec, Canada. In 1950, he received a nine-month scholarship to study at the École des Beaux-Arts in Paris by the French government.  He also trained at the Otis School of Drawing.

Later Painting Career

Manansala's paintings are the best and were celebrated as the best of the barrio and the city together.  His Madonna of the Slums is a portrayal of a mother and child from the countryside who became urban shanty residents once in the city.  In his Jeepneys, Manansala combined the elements of provincial folk culture with the congestion issues of the city.

Manansala developed transparent cubism, wherein the "delicate tones, shapes, and patterns of figure and environment are masterfully superimposed".  A fine example of Manansala using this "transparent and translucent" technique is his composition, kalabaw (Carabao).

Vicente Manansala, a National Artist of the Philippines in Visual Arts, was a direct influence to his fellow Filipino neo-realists: Malang, Angelito Antonio, Norma Belleza and Manuel Baldemor.  The Honolulu Museum of Art, the Lopez Memorial Museum (Manila), the Philippine Center (New York City), the Singapore Art Museum and Holy Angel University (Angeles City, Philippines) are among the public collections holding work by Vicente Manansala. Holy Angel University recently opened a section of its museum called The Vicente Manansala Collection, holding most of the estate left by the artist.

Death

Manansala died on August 22, 1981, in Manila, Philippines, due to lung cancer.

Works
 Madonna of the Slums oil on lawanit board. 86 x 61 cm. 1950.

 Machinery
 Birdman. 1973. - this painting was subjected to a forgery incident in 2012 
 Jeepneys
Magsasaka
 Pounding Rice
 Kalabaw (Carabao), oil on canvas, 28.5 inches x 38 inches, 1965
 Murals "Stations of the cross " in the Church of the Parish of the Holy Sacrifice
 Bangkusay Seascape. 1940. Oil on canvas. 14 x 18 inches.
 Pila Pila sa Bigas (Left and Right), 1980. Oil on canvas. 51 x 84 inches.
 Planting the First Cross
 Seal of the Arellano University
 Slum Dwellers
 Bayanihan
 Balut Vendors
 Jansen Rodriguez
 Pamilya
 Reclining Mother and Child
 Dambana
 The Musicians

References

2. The Cruz, Manansala, López family clan.

External links
 Finding Manansala: Tracing the works of a National Artist for Visual Arts 

National Artists of the Philippines
1910 births
1981 deaths
Artists from Pampanga
Kapampangan people
20th-century Filipino painters
Burials at the Libingan ng mga Bayani